WNJN-FM (89.7 FM) is a radio station licensed to Atlantic City, New Jersey. The station is owned by WHYY, Inc., and simulcasts the public radio news and talk programming of WHYY-FM in Philadelphia, Pennsylvania.

History

The station was formerly owned and operated by the New Jersey Network. NJN's radio network began operation May 20, 1991, when WNJT-FM in Trenton signed on. Eight other stations would be established over the following seventeen years.

On June 6, 2011, the New Jersey Public Broadcasting Authority agreed to sell five FM stations in southern New Jersey to WHYY. The transaction was announced by Governor Chris Christie, as part of his long-term goal to end State-subsidized public broadcasting.  The five stations previously belonged to New Jersey Network's statewide radio service.  WHYY assumed control of the stations through a management agreement on July 1, 2011, pending Federal Communications Commission (FCC) approval for the acquisition; at that point, the stations began to carry the WHYY-FM schedule.

References

External links
whyy.org

NJN-FM
Radio stations established in 1997
1997 establishments in New Jersey
NPR member stations